Indigo Children is a 2012 American drama film about the romance between two teenagers based on the concept of the existence of indigo children, who allegedly possess special faculties. Directed by Eric Chaney, this film was inspired by the first girl he ever loved.

Cast 
Robert Olsen as Mark
Isabelle McNally as Christina
Christine Donlon as Jenny

Plot summary 
The movie shows a relationship of two teenagers in suburban New Jersey, who over the duration of summer develop their romance and explore their alleged cryptic psychic abilities.

Awards 
The film won the Best of Show, feature film at the Accolade Global Film Competition 2012.

References

External links 
 
 
 

2012 films
2012 romantic drama films
American romantic drama films
2010s English-language films
2010s American films